The first legislative assembly Election to the Madras state based on universal adult suffrage was held in March 1952. This was the first election held in Madras state after the Indian Independence. This election was officially known as the 1951 Madras State Election, even though through delays, actual voting didn't take place until early 1952.

No single party obtained a simple majority to form an independent Government. C. Rajagopalachari (Rajaji) of the Indian National Congress became the Chief Minister after a series of re-alignments among various political parties and Independents. The Telugu speaking regions of Madras State split to form the Andhra state in 1953, leading to the consolidation of the non-Brahmin Congress faction under the leadership of K. Kamaraj. Faced with internal dissent and heavy opposition to his Hereditary education policy, Rajaji resigned in 1954. In the ensuing leadership struggle, Kamaraj defeated Rajaji's chosen successor C. Subramaniam and became the Chief Minister on 31 March 1954.

Background

Factionalism in Congress
In the years after the 1946 election, factionalism was common place in the Congress party in Madras. During 1946–51, three different Congress chief ministers headed the Madras government. T. Prakasam was the Chief Minister of Madras presidency immediately after the 1946 election. As a Telugu speaker, he was often at odds with the Madras Provincial Congress Committee president K. Kamaraj. Kamaraj forced the resignation of Prakasam within a year. In 1947, Omandur Ramaswamy Reddiar, Kamaraj's nominee, became the Chief Minister. When Reddiar showed signs of independence, Kamaraj engineered his removal by a vote of no confidence in Congress Legislature Party on 31 March 1949. P. S. Kumaraswamy Raja, the next Chief Minister who formed the Government on 6 April 1949 was believed to be a stooge of Kamaraj. He retained the chiefministership till the 1952 election when he lost his seat in Srivilliputhur constituency. The main factions within the Madras Congress Party during this period were: 1) the Andhra (Prakasam) faction, 2) the Rajaji faction 3) Kamaraj faction (Tamil non-Brahmin members) and 4)the Bezawada Gopala Reddy and Kala Venkata Rao faction supported by the All India Congress Committee president Pattabhi Sitaramayya

The Prakasam faction later split from the Congress to form the Hyderabad State Praja Party. The party merged with the Kisan Mazdoor Praja Party in June 1951.

Communists in electoral process
In 1951, the Communist Party of India (CPI) which had been waging an armed struggle during 1948–51, gave up the attempt to wrest power through force and joined the political mainstream. At the 1951 congress of the party, "People's Democracy" was replaced by "National Democracy" as the main slogan of the party and the decision was made to contest the elections. One of the armed movements supported by the CPI was the Telangana Rebellion in the princely state of Hyderabad. Though the rebellion was crushed by 1951, the communists retained widespread support in the neighboring Andhra region. This was due to their policy of linguistic nationalism (the demand for a separate state of Telugu speaking people) and their support base amongst the Kamma caste which was opposed to the Reddy supported Congress. Till then, all the previous elections had been conducted on a limited franchise based on property ownership qualifications. The election of 1951 was the first one to be based on a universal franchise. The Communists had the support of most of the first time voters – landless peasants and agricultural labourers. They also had a strong presence in the agrarian district of Tanjore in Tamil Nadu where they were supported by the Dravidar Kazhagam.

Split in the Dravidian Movement
The Dravidar Kazhagam (DK), the main opposition party to the Congress in the Tamil speaking areas of the state split in 1949. C. N. Annadurai, once a protege of the DK leader Periyar E. V. Ramasamy, quit the DK and founded a new party – Dravida Munnetra Kazhagam (DMK). Both the DK and the DMK were secessionist advocates for Dravidistan- a separate state for Dravidians. Some of the old guard of the Justice party, which had been renamed as Dravidar Kazhagam in 1944, refused to accept Periyar's leadership. Led by P. T. Rajan, they insisted they were still the real Justice party and contested the 1952 elections under the "Scales" symbol.

Constituencies
According to the Delimitation of Parliamentary and Assembly Constituencies (Madras) Order, 1951, made by the President under sections 6 and 9 of the Representation of the People Act, 1950, the Madras Legislative Assembly consisted of 375 seats to be filled by election, distributed in 309 constituencies and 62 two-member constituencies in each of which a seat had been reserved for Scheduled Castes and four two-member constituencies in each of which a seat had been reserved for Scheduled Tribes. Three seats were uncontested. The elections were conducted for the remaining 372 seats.

The two member constituencies were established in accordance to Article 332 of the Indian Constitution. The voting method and the plurality electoral formula were defined in The Representation of People Act, 1950. Out of the total 309 constituencies in the undivided Madras State, 66 were two member constituencies, 62 of which had one seat reserved for Scheduled Caste candidates and 4 for Scheduled Tribe candidates. These constituencies were larger in size and had greater number of voters (more than 1,00,000) when compared to general constituencies. Two separate list of candidates, a general list and a reserved list, contested in those constituencies. Each voter had to cast two votes – one for each list.

The two winners were chosen as follows:

 Reserved Member – Candidate with the most votes among the reserved (SC/ST) list candidates
 General Member – Candidate with the most votes among the rest of the candidates excluding the Reserved Member (including both reserved and general lists).

This system led to anomalies. In some cases like the Coimbatore – II constituency in the 1957 election, both elected members belonged to the reserved list – the candidate with second highest number of votes in reserved list secured more votes than the highest vote getter in the general list. Multiple members were elected only in the 1952 and 1957 elections as double member representation was abolished in 1961 by the enactment of Two-Member Constituencies Abolition Act (1961).

Political Parties
The main opponents for the Congress in Madras were the CPI, Prakasam's Kisan Mazdoor Praja Party (KMPP) and the Krishikar Lok Party led by N. G. Ranga (a breakaway group from KMPP's predecessor - the Hyderabad State Praja Party). The Dravida Munnetra Kazhagam (DMK) did not contest the 1952 election. Instead it supported the candidates of the Vanniyar caste based parties – the Commonweal Party and the Tamil Nadu Toilers Party – and five independents in Chengelpet, Salem, North and South Arcot districts. The candidates they backed had to sign a pledge to support DMK's agenda in the legislative assembly. The Dravidar Kazhagam also did not participate directly in the election. However, it supported the Communists in an effort to defeat the Indian National Congress which it claimed was a Brahmin dominated party. It also supported a number of other parties and Independents in the election. The Justice party, led by P. T. Rajan contested in nine seats.

Election
Polling was held in nine phases (2, 5, 8, 9, 11, 12, 16, 21 and 25 January) in January 1952. In all, 2,507 persons filed their nominations-2,472 men and 35 women. Of these, the nominations were rejected in respect of 79 candidates-78 men and one woman. Seven hundred and fifty-one candidates withdrew their nominations in time-741 men and 10 women.

Results

!colspan=9|
|- style="background-color:#E9E9E9; text-align:center;"
! class="unsortable" |
! Political party !! Flag !! Seats  Contested !! Won !! % of  Seats !! Votes !! Vote %
! class="unsortable"|Govt.  Formation
|- style="background: #90EE90;"
| 
| 
| 367 || 152 || 40.53 || 69,88,701 || 34.88
| rowspan="2" style="background-color:#90EE90;text-align:center"|Leading Party

|-
| 
|
| 163 || 13 || 3.47 || 12,99,282 || 6.48
|-
| 
|
| 148 || 35 || 9.33 || 18,03,377 || 9.00
| rowspan="2" style="background-color:#00FF00;text-align:center"|**Full support
|-
| 
| 
| 131 || 62 || 16.53 || 26,40,337 || 13.18
|- style="background: #00FF7F;"
|#
|
| 63 || 15 || 4.00 || 6,29,893 || 3.14
| rowspan="4" style="background-color:#00FA9A;text-align:center"|*Outside support, joined the cabinet  in 1954
|-
| 
| 
| 37 || 2 || 0.53 || 3,39,680 || 1.70
|- style="background: #00FA9A;"
|*
|
| 34 || 19 || 5.07 || 8,52,330 || 4.25
|- style="background: #00FF00;"
|**
|
| 13 || 6 || 1.60 || 2,18,288 || 1.09
|- style="background: #00FF00;"
|**
| 
| 13 || 5 || 1.33 || 1,86,546 || 0.93
| rowspan="4" style="background-color:#00FF7F;text-align:center"|#3 KLP legislators  and  15 Independents  joined Congress
|-
| 
|
| 9 || 1 || 0.27 || 82,231 || 0.41
|-
| 
|
| 6 || 3 || 0.80 || 1,38,203 || 0.69
|- style="background: #00FF7F;"
| #
|
| 667 || 62 || 16.53 || 47,58,768 || 23.75
|- class="unsortable" style="background-color:#E9E9E9"
! colspan = 3| Total seats
! 375 !! style="text-align:center;" |Voters !! 3,66,00,615 !! style="text-align:center;" |Turnout

! colspan = 2| 2,00,38,423 (54.75%)
|}

Government formation

Election of C. Rajagopalachari 

The composite Madras State then included parts of Andhra Pradesh, Kerala and Karnataka with a total of 375 assembly members.  The Indian National Congress was reduced to a minority with 152 members in an assembly of 375. It won 4 seats from the 29 in Malabar, 43 of the 143 in the Andhra areas, 96 of the 190 Tamil constituencies and 9 of the 11 seats from Kannada speaking areas. Kumaraswami Raja, the incumbent Chief Minister lost the election along with five members of his cabinet (Bezawada Gopala Reddy, Kala Venkata Rao, K. Chandramouli, K. Madhava Menon and M. Bhaktavatsalam).

A large number of CPI members were elected from Andhra region of Madras state which had for some years demanded a separate state for Telugu speaking areas. In February 1952, the non-congress members convened under T. Prakasam, leader of the KMPP, at Madras to form the United Democratic Front (UDF) and issued a "Common Minimum Program". They claimed to control 166 seats (CPI and CPI backed independents – 70, KMPP – 36, Tamil Nadu Toilers Party – 19, Commonweal party – 6, FBL (MG) – 3, SCF – 1, JUSP −1 and Independents – 30). Prakasam wrote to the Governor Sri Prakasa staking his claim to form the Government as the leader of the single largest formation. The Congress did not want the Communists taking power or to impose Governor's rule in the state. It brought Rajaji out of retirement to form the Government as a consensus candidate.
Kamaraj, President of the Madras Provincial Congress Committee was of the opinion that the UDF should be allowed to form the Government as he had predicted the weak coalition might eventually fall apart. However other leaders such as T. T. Krishnamachari and Ramnath Goenka wanted Rajaji to be nominated to form the Government.

Rajaji was invited by Sri Prakasa to form the Government on 1 April 1952 and was sworn in on 10 April 1952. He refused to run for a by-election and the Governor nominated him for the assembly's upper house (Legislative Council). It was considered to be a "constitutional impropriety" as the nomination of a member to the Council could be done only at the recommendation of the cabinet. But in this case, the Governor acted unilaterally when no cabinet had been formed yet. On 6 May, the incumbent Speaker of the assembly, J. Shivashanmugam Pillai of the Congress was reelected as the Speaker defeating independent MLA Swayamprakasam by 206 votes to 162. On 3 July, Rajaji was able to win a vote of confidence with the support of 200 members with 151 opposing (and 1 neutral). This was the first time such a "confidence motion" was moved in any legislature in India. He was able to secure the majority by engineering a series of defections from the UDF and with the help of other parties:

 The support of the 6 members of Commonweal Party, (one of the two parties representing the cause of Vanniars) was obtained by giving a cabinet position to its leader  – M. A. Manickavelu Naicker. 19 members of the other Vanniyar party – Tamil Nadu Toilers Party led by S. S. Ramasami Padayachi also supported the vote of confidence but did not join the cabinet. (They later joined the Kamaraj cabinet in 1954).
 Many independents joined Congress and became Congress Legislators. The strength of the Congress Legislative Party (CLP) which was 152 on 1 April 1952, increased to 165 by 3 May and to 167 by 30 September.
 Rajaji split the Krishikar Lok Party and KLP legislators P. Thimma Reddy, Neeladri Rao Reddy and Kumisetti Venkatanarayana Dora joined the Congress.
 The 5 members of the Madras State Muslim League provided their support to congress to prevent the communists from gaining power.

Election of K. Kamaraj 
Andhra State was formed from the Telugu-speaking regions of Madras State after a widespread agitation in 1953. The Madras assembly was reduced from 375 to 230, 140 members going to Andhra and 5 to Mysore with the Congress Party controlling 118 seats; an outright majority. This strengthened the positions of non-Brahmin Congress forces under the leadership of K. Kamaraj. He ousted Rajaji on 31 March 1954 and was elected the leader of Congress Legislative Party. Kamaraj consolidated his position by offering ministerial position to leaders of Tamil Nadu Toilers Party and Commonweal Party. This event marked the end of Brahmin domination in Tamil Nadu Congress.

Impact
Kamaraj resigned his presidency of the Provincial Congress Committee owning responsibility for the election loss and was soon replaced by P. Subbarayan. Rajaji's nomination to the Legislative Council was challenged in the Madras High Court by P. Ramamurthi, the CPI MLA from Madurai North Constituency. Chief Justice Rajamannar and Justice Venkatarama Ayyar, who heard the public interest writ petition declined to intervene by opining that "the court could not decide political rights or enforce public interest or constitutional conventions". This precedent set by Governor Prakasa became the first among a long list of constitutional improprieties committed by governors to help the party in power in the central government. The Sarkaria Commission established in 1983 to examine the balance of power between state and central governments remarked on the precedent that the "Governor's task is to see that a government is formed and not to try to form a government which will pursue the policies he approves".

Cabinet

Rajagopalachari's Cabinet 

Changes
 Ministers belonging to Bellary and Andhra constituencies (Naganna Gowda, Sankara Reddi, Pattabirama Rao, Sanjeevayya and Ranga Reddi) stepped down on 30 September 1953, a day before Andhra State split to form a separate state. The portfolios of Agriculture, Forests, Fisheries, Cinchona, Rural Welfare, Community Projects and National Extension Schemes were handed over to M. Bhaktavatsalam on 9 October 1953. Jothi Venkatachalam was made minister for Prohibition and Women's Welfare. K. Rajaram Naidu became the Minister for Local Administration. C. Subramaniam was given the additional portfolios of education, information and publicity. V. C. Palaniswamy Gounder was put in charge of Veterinary, Animal Husbandry and Harijan welfare.

Kamaraj's Cabinet
Members of cabinet who served between 13 April 1954 – 13 April 1957 under the Chief Ministership of Kamraj are

 Changes

 Following the States Reorganisation Act of 1956, A. B. Shetty quit the Ministry on 1 March 1956 and his portfolio was shared between other ministers in the cabinet.

List of elected members

Tamil Nadu 
Election results from constituencies which would later become part of Tamil Nadu, Andhra Pradesh, Kerala and Karnataka are listed here.

Andhra

Karnataka

Kerala

Delimitation and Reorganisation
On 1 October 1953, a separate Andhra State consisting of the Telugu-speaking areas of the composite Madras State was formed and the Kannada-speaking area of Bellary District was merged with the then Mysore State. This reduced the strength of the Legislative Assembly to 231.

On 1 November 1956, Madras State was re-organized as per States Reorganisation Act, 1956. Malabar District of the State was transferred to the new State of Kerala, and a new union territory, Laccadive, Minicoy and Amindivi Islands, was carved out. The southern part (Tamil-speaking area) of Travancore-Cochin (present day Kanyakumari district) and Shenkottah taluk were merged into the State. Later in 1968, the state was renamed as Tamil Nadu. This led to re-organization of legislative assembly constituencies during 1957 assembly elections in the State.

The strength of the Madras Legislative Assembly was increased to 205 in accordance with the new Delimitation of Parliamentary and Assembly Constituencies Order 1956, made by the Delimitation Commission of India under the provisions of the State Reorganisation Act, 1956. The 1957 elections were conducted for these 205 seats.

See also 
Elections in Tamil Nadu
Elections in Andhra Pradesh
Elections in Kerala
Legislature of Tamil Nadu
Government of Tamil Nadu

Footnotes and References

External links
 Election Commission of India
 1951/52 Madras State Election Results, Election Commission of India

State Assembly elections in Tamil Nadu
Madras
March 1952 events in Asia
1950s in Madras State